In knot theory, a figure-eight knot (also called Listing's knot) is the unique knot with a crossing number of four.  This makes it the knot with the third-smallest possible crossing number, after the unknot and the
trefoil knot. The figure-eight knot is a prime knot.

Origin of name 
The name is given because tying a normal figure-eight knot in a rope and then joining the ends together, in the most natural way, gives a model of the mathematical knot.

Description 

A simple parametric representation of the figure-eight knot is as the set of all points (x,y,z) where

for t varying over the real numbers (see 2D visual realization at bottom right).

The figure-eight knot is prime, alternating, rational with an associated value
of 5/3, and is achiral. The figure-eight knot is also a fibered knot. This follows from other, less simple (but very interesting) representations of the knot: 

(1) It is a homogeneous closed braid (namely, the closure of the 3-string braid σ1σ2−1σ1σ2−1), and a theorem of John Stallings shows that any closed homogeneous braid is fibered. 

(2) It is the link at (0,0,0,0) of an isolated critical point of a real-polynomial map F: R4→R2, so (according to a theorem of John Milnor) the Milnor map of F is actually a fibration.  Bernard Perron found the first such F for this knot, namely,

 

where

Mathematical properties 

The figure-eight knot has played an important role historically (and continues to do so) in the theory of 3-manifolds.  Sometime in the mid-to-late 1970s, William Thurston showed that the figure-eight was hyperbolic, by decomposing its complement into two ideal hyperbolic tetrahedra.  (Robert Riley and Troels Jørgensen, working independently of each other, had earlier shown that the figure-eight knot was hyperbolic by other means.) This construction, new at the time, led him to many powerful results and methods.  For example, he was able to show that all but ten Dehn surgeries on the figure-eight knot resulted in non-Haken, non-Seifert-fibered irreducible 3-manifolds; these were the first such examples.  Many more have been discovered by generalizing Thurston's construction to other knots and links.

The figure-eight knot is also the hyperbolic knot whose complement has the smallest possible volume, where  is the Lobachevsky function. From this perspective, the figure-eight knot can be considered the simplest hyperbolic knot.   The figure eight knot complement is a double-cover of the Gieseking manifold, which has the smallest volume among non-compact hyperbolic 3-manifolds.

The figure-eight knot and the (−2,3,7) pretzel knot are the only two hyperbolic knots known to have more than 6 exceptional surgeries, Dehn surgeries resulting in a non-hyperbolic 3-manifold; they have 10 and 7, respectively.  A theorem of Lackenby and Meyerhoff, whose proof relies on the geometrization conjecture and computer assistance, holds that 10 is the largest possible number of exceptional surgeries of any hyperbolic knot. However, it is not currently known whether the figure-eight knot is the only one that achieves the bound of 10.  A well-known conjecture is that the bound (except for the two knots mentioned) is 6.

The figure-eight knot has genus 1 and is fibered. 
Therefore its complement fibers over the circle, the fibers being Seifert surfaces which are 2-dimensional tori with one boundary component. 
The monodromy map is then a homeomorphism of the 2-torus, which can be represented in this case by the matrix .

Invariants
The Alexander polynomial of the figure-eight knot is

the Conway polynomial is

and the Jones polynomial is

Notes

References

Further reading
 Ian Agol, Bounds on exceptional Dehn filling, Geometry & Topology 4 (2000), 431–449.  
 Chun Cao and Robert Meyerhoff, The orientable cusped hyperbolic 3-manifolds of minimum volume, Inventiones Mathematicae, 146  (2001), no. 3, 451–478.   
 Marc Lackenby, Word hyperbolic Dehn surgery, Inventiones Mathematicae 140 (2000), no. 2, 243–282. 
 Marc Lackenby and Robert Meyerhoff, The maximal number of exceptional Dehn surgeries, arXiv:0808.1176
 Robion Kirby, Problems in low-dimensional topology, (see problem 1.77, due to Cameron Gordon, for exceptional slopes)
 William Thurston, The Geometry and Topology of Three-Manifolds, Princeton University lecture notes (1978–1981).

External links
 
 

3-manifolds
Double torus knots and links